WHVP may stand for:

 Wedged hepatic vein pressure
 WHVP (FM), a radio station in Hudson, New York